Tikvesh uprising was an uprising in the Tikveš region of Macedonia in late June 1913. 

It was organized by Internal Macedonian Revolutionary Organization (IMRO) against the Serbian troops in Vardar Macedonia between the First and the Second Balkan War. As the First Balkan War was coming to its final border arrangements, the pressures on the Bulgarian Exarchate and on the Macedonian Bulgarian ethnic community in the Ottoman areas that came under Greek and Serbian control were intensifying. According to the report of the International Commission on the Balkan Wars Serbia implemented there a program of "assimilation through terror". IMRO acted in close coordination with the Bulgarian army, which troops at the time were located on the left bank of the Vardar river. The rebellion started prematurely on June 15, 1913, after the secret uprising conspiracy had been revealed by the local Serbian authorities. The organisers had planned to start armed resistance against the oppressors after the Bulgarian Army had begun operations in the region.

The rebellion spread in the regions of Kavadarci, Negotino and the village of Vatasha. Two large rebel groups were set up with leaders Doncho Lazarov and Mishe Shkartov. Serbian army unit in Negotino was attacked and forced out from the town, Kavadarci and Vatasha were liberated soon after. The rebellions set up a provisional Bulgarian government in these settlements. Reorganized Serbian army troops and irregulars led by Vasilije Trbić were sent to crush the uprising. On June 25, after realising that help from the Bulgarian army would not be coming soon, the rebels moved out from the towns. In the following days the Serbian army brutally suppressed the uprising and terrorized the Bulgarian population in the rebelling regions. According to some sources 363 civilian Bulgarians were killed in Kavadarci, 230 - in Negotino and 40 - in Vatasha. As result, Bulgaria, dissatisfied with the results of the First Balkan War, attacked its former allies, Serbia and Greece, on 29 June, 1913 starting the Second Balkan War.

See also

National awakening of Bulgaria
Bulgarian Exarchate
April Uprising of 1876
Razlovtsi insurrection
Liberation of Bulgaria
Kresna–Razlog uprising
Bulgarian unification
Ilinden–Preobrazhenie Uprising
First Balkan War
Second Balkan War
Ohrid–Debar uprising
Macedonism

External links 
 Petre Kamchevski: The Tikvesh uprising left a large scar in the history of this region - Focus Agency, An Interview with the curator of the Museum in Kavadarci, Republic of Macedonia. (in Bulgarian)

References 

Vardar Macedonia (1912–1918)
20th-century rebellions
Military history of North Macedonia
Bulgarian rebellions
1913 in Bulgaria
1913 in Serbia
Conflicts in 1913
Internal Macedonian Revolutionary Organization
Serbian war crimes in the Balkan Wars
Kavadarci Municipality
Negotino Municipality
Vardar Macedonia (1918–1941)
June 1913 events
Mass murder in 1913
Macedonian Question